MV Kinryu Maru  was a  passenger cargo ship built by Kawasaki Dockyard Company, Kobe for Kokusai Kisen Kabushiki Kaisha in 1937. She was requisitioned on 1 September 1938 by the Imperial Japanese Navy and later converted to an armed merchant ship.

Kinryu Maru was at Kwajalein, from which she deployed as part of the Japanese task force in the first attempt to invade Wake Island on 8 December 1941. She returned to Kwajalein and the landing force was called off and later participated in the second attack on Wake Island on 21 December 1941, which succeeded in taking the island. She also took part in the invasions of New Britain, New Ireland and Lae.

Fate
On 25 August 1942, north of Guadalcanal, she was attacked by Douglas SBD Dauntless dive bombers and was hit amidships by a  bomb and began sinking. Yayoi rescued the ship's survivors, including Captain Yamada. She was removed from the Navy List on 1 October 1942.

Notes

External links
 Chronological List of Japanese Merchant Vessel Losses
 Combinedfleet.com

1938 ships
Auxiliary ships of the Imperial Japanese Navy
Ships sunk by US aircraft
Shipwrecks in the Solomon Sea
Maritime incidents in August 1942